Robert K. Kraft Field at Lawrence A. Wien Stadium, officially known as Robert K. Kraft Field at Lawrence A. Wien Stadium at Baker Athletics Complex, is a stadium in the Inwood neighborhood at the northern tip of the island of Manhattan, New York City. Part of Columbia University's Baker Athletics Complex, it is primarily used for American football, lacrosse, and track and field events. The stadium opened in 1984 and holds 17,100 people.

Baker Athletics Complex history
The Baker Athletics Complex, originally Baker Field, is Columbia's outdoor athletic complex.  Previously, all outdoor teams had played on South Field, across 116th Street from Low Memorial Library, the field where Lou Gehrig played for the Lions; it is now partially covered by Butler Library.

The athletic complex is located between the corner of Broadway and West 218th Street and Spuyten Duyvil Creek – the confluence of the Harlem and Hudson rivers – in the Inwood neighborhood of Manhattan, at the northern tip of Manhattan Island. It was purchased for the university by financier George Fisher Baker for $700,000 in December 1921.  It was dedicated the following April, but it was not until 1923 that the team began playing there.  A 32,000-seat wooden stadium was built on the site in 1928; this was in use until 1982, when it was demolished to make room for the current Wien Stadium.

The "new" stadium
Wien opened on September 22, 1984, with a game that ended in a loss to Harvard.  The first home win at the stadium came on October 8, 1988, over Princeton.  The 10,500-seat southeast (home side) stands were built first; the 6,500-seat northwest stands opened two years later.  The stadium is named for Lawrence Wien, class of 1925, a former trustee, philanthropist, lawyer and entrepreneur.  After a $5 million donation by Robert Kraft, class of 1963, the field was named in his honor on October 13, 2007. For the first 11 seasons, Wien Stadium had grass and then AstroTurf from 1995 to 2004 but as of 2005 has since switched to FieldTurf.

Possible replacement
In April 2015, New York City FC of Major League Soccer was reported to be considering building a new stadium at the Baker Athletics Complex. The Lawrence A. Wien Stadium would be demolished and replaced by a 25,000-seat stadium to be used by both NYCFC and the Columbia Lions.

Transformation to COVID field hospital
In response to the COVID-19 pandemic in New York City, NewYork-Presbyterian / Columbia University Irving Medical Center turned Robert K. Kraft Field and Columbia Soccer Stadium into a 288-bed field hospital. The field hospital is named for decorated US Navy SEAL Ryan F. Larkin (1987–2017), who served in Iraq and Afghanistan. Kate Kemplin, head nurse of the operation, described Larkin as "exactly the kind of person who would have set up a tent to treat patients, if he were alive today." The care center was staffed primarily with former US military personnel in conjunction with NewYork-Presbyterian's frontline staff.

See also
 List of NCAA Division I FCS football stadiums

References

External links

 Columbia Athletics Facilities: Lawrence A. Wien Stadium
 Baker Field history

Columbia Lions football
Columbia University
Inwood, Manhattan
U.S. Route 9
College football venues
College lacrosse venues in the United States
College soccer venues in the United States
College track and field venues in the United States
Giants
Athletics (track and field) venues in New York City
Lacrosse venues in New York City
Soccer venues in New York City
Sports venues in Manhattan
Sports venues completed in 1984
1984 establishments in New York City